Thomas Brooke (born 1978) is an English actor. He is best known for playing the roles of Thick Kevin in The Boat That Rocked (2009), Bill Wiggins and Andy Apsted in the BBC One television series Sherlock and Bodyguard respectively, and Fiore in the AMC television series Preacher.

Early life
He is the son of actor Paul Brooke. Brooke attended Alleyn's School in Dulwich, London and Hull University. He trained at the London Academy of Music and Dramatic Art.

Career
Brooke played Bill Wiggins in series 3 of BBC's Sherlock, "Lame" Lothar Frey in season 3 of HBO's Game of Thrones, and Fiore in AMC's Preacher.

In 2011 Brooke played the dimwitted Lee in Jez Butterworth's much garlanded play Jerusalem at The Royal Court theatre to great acclaim. The following year he reprised the role in the play's first West End run at The Apollo, and was soon after cast in the lead role of the National Theatre's revival of Arnold Wesker's The Kitchen to critical plaudits.

Filmography

Film

Television

Awards
Brooke received the TMA Award for Best Supporting Actor for his performance in The Long and the Short and the Tall at the Sheffield Lyceum in 2006.

References

External links
 
 Brooke's page at Royal Court Productions

Living people
1978 births
Male actors from London
English male stage actors
English male television actors
People educated at Alleyn's School
Alumni of the University of Hull